Aerospace Data Facility-Southwest (ADF-SW) is one of three satellite ground stations operated by the National Reconnaissance Office (NRO) in the continental United States. Located within White Sands Missile Range in southern New Mexico, the facility is responsible for the command and control of reconnaissance satellites involved in the collection of intelligence information and for the dissemination of that intelligence to other U.S. government agencies.

List of commanders
Col Kelly D. Burt, May 2018
Col Michael C. Todd, 8 July 2020

See also
 Aerospace Data Facility-Colorado
 Aerospace Data Facility-East
 Pine Gap
 RAF Menwith Hill
 Spy satellite

References

National Reconnaissance Office
Buildings and structures in Doña Ana County, New Mexico